Jean Bauhin (24 August 1511 – 23 January 1582) was a French physician.  He was born in Amiens, France and died in Basel, Switzerland, where he had to relocate after converting to Protestantism.

He was the physician to Jeanne d'Albret, Queen of Navarre.

He had three sons, two of whom were also physicians and notable botanists: Johann Bauhin (also known as Jean Bauhin, 1541–1613) and Gaspard Bauhin (Caspar Bauhin, 1560–1624).

References

 

1511 births
1582 deaths
Converts to Protestantism from Roman Catholicism
16th-century French physicians